Beatrix Amelie Ehrengard Eilika von Storch (née Herzogin von Oldenburg; 27 May 1971) is a German politician and lawyer, who has been the Deputy Leader of the Alternative for Germany since July 2015 and a Member of the Bundestag since September 2017. She previously was a Member of the European Parliament (MEP) from Germany. From April 2016 to 2017 she was also a member of the right-wing populist Anti-EU group Europe of Freedom and Direct Democracy. She is part of the right-wing conservative wing of the parliamentary group of the AfD. She belongs ancestrally to the royal House of Oldenburg which reigned over the Grand Duchy of Oldenburg until 1918.

Family background
In accordance with the traditions of the House of Oldenburg, her dynastic style from birth was Her Highness Duchess Beatrix Amelie Ehrengard Eilika of Oldenburg. She is the elder daughter of Duke Huno of Oldenburg (b. 1940) and his wife, Countess Felicitas-Anita "Fenita" Schwerin von Krosigk (b. 1941). Her father is a younger son of Nikolaus, Hereditary Grand Duke of Oldenburg (1897–1970), erstwhile head of the former ruling family of Oldenburg that lost its throne in 1918. She belongs to the same male-line as the royal houses of Denmark and Norway, the deposed royal house of Greece and imperial Russia, and Charles III, king of the United Kingdom and 14 other Commonwealth realms, to which last crown she is also distantly in line in accordance with the Act of Settlement 1701.

Her maternal grandfather was Lutz Graf Schwerin von Krosigk, who served as finance minister from 1932 in the Weimar Republic until the defeat of Nazi Germany in 1945. After the death of Adolf Hitler and Joseph Goebbels he additionally served as the Leading Minister and foreign minister of the short-lived Flensburg Government of Karl Dönitzand so as the de facto last head of government of Nazi Germany announced on 7 May 1945, via radio Reichssender Flensburg the unconditional surrender of the German Wehrmacht, thus ending the war in Europe.

Her cousin, Eilika of Oldenburg, is married to Georg von Habsburg, a son of Otto, the last Crown Prince of Austria-Hungary.

Personal life
On 22 October 2010 she married German-Chilean businessman Sven von Storch (born 1970), member of a German noble family from Mecklenburg. He is the son of businessman Berndt Detlev von Storch (1930–2004) and Antje Liete Krüger-Franke (b. 1938).

Education and early career
Von Storch was a banker before she studied law in Heidelberg and Lausanne. She worked as a lawyer in Berlin when she began her political career. She has also been a member of the Friedrich A. von Hayek Society.

Political career

Together with her husband, she founded several conservative associations. On several occasions, the tax authorities have investigated the couple, accused in particular of having misappropriated donations intended for their associations.

Von Storch was a co-founder of the Göttinger Kreis – Students for the Rule of Law Association – an organization which sought to campaign for reparation for the expulsions and nationalization of land in the Soviet occupied zones of Germany and the former East Germany. The organization calls for appropriated land to be returned to their original owners. The association organized various events with Mikhail Gorbachev, among others.

Von Storch was a member of the Free Democratic Party and in 2013, became a founding member of Election Alternative 13 set up by Bernd Lucke as the precursor to Alternative for Germany.

In 2014, Beatrix von Storch was elected a Member of European Parliament representing Alternative for Germany. Initially a member of the European Conservatives and Reformists group, she left the group in April 2016, forestalling her imminent expulsion, and immediately joined the Europe of Freedom and Direct Democracy (EFDD) group. In the 2017 German federal election, she was elected to the Bundestag and presently serves as deputy chairwoman of the AfD's parliamentary faction. Following her election to the Bundenstag, she resigned her seat in the European parliament and was replaced by Jörg Meuthen.

Von Storch has been described as a social conservative. She has expressed opposition to same-sex marriage and abortion. She has accused school gay youth networks of using "forced sexualization" on their students. Von Storch also supported the United Kingdom's vote for Brexit and is a friend of British eurosceptic politician Nigel Farage. In parliament, she regularly shows her support for Israel which she regards as an ally in the fight against Islamism and in 2017 created the pro-Israel "Friends of Judea-Samaria" group in the European Parliament. Asked in 2016 about the ideological proximity between the AfD and the Front national, she believes that on economic issues, Marine Le Pen is too far to the left, stating that she does not agree with Le Pen's ideas on protectionism and state interventionism. She has been characterized as a member and supporter of the more moderate Alternative Mitte faction of the AfD.

Controversies

Legal battle with the Berliner Schaubühne
In November 2015, a leading Berlin theatre, the Schaubühne, was brought into legal conflict with Beatrix von Storch over a play, Falk Richter's FEAR, that parodied AfD leaders as zombies and mass murderers. Beatrix von Storch is depicted facing retribution for her grandfather's role as a minister in Hitler's government. AfD Spokesperson Christian Lüth responded by interrupting a performance and filming it. Beatrix von Storch and the conservative activist Hedwig von Beverfoerde then requested and obtained a preliminary injunction against the theatre, prohibiting it from using images of them in the production. They charged that the use of the images violated their human dignity protected under the Constitution. On 15 December 2015, the court ruled against the complainants in favour of the theatre's freedom of expression and lifted the injunctions against using the images. The judges commented that 'any audience member can recognize that this is just a play'.

Remarks about use of deadly force against refugees
In late February 2016, von Storch was "pied" by members of the German left-wing group Peng Collective at a party meeting in Kassel. The activists, dressed as clowns, protested against her assertion that German border control personnel had the right to shoot at incoming illegal immigrants. A YouTube video of the assault gained wide attention in social media.

"Rapist hordes" tweet
Von Storch's Twitter account was blocked for twelve hours after she posted a criticism of the Cologne Police Department for publishing a New Years greeting in Arabic as well as in German, French and English. She had written: "What the hell is wrong with this country? Why is the official page of the police in NRW tweeting in Arabic? Are they seeking to appease the barbaric, Muslim, rapist hordes of men?" Cologne was the location of multiple sexual assaults and robbery on New Year's Eve, December 2015 (see New Year's Eve sexual assaults in Germany). Other prominent members of the AfD quickly sprang to von Storch's defense, including Alice Weidel.

Ancestry

See also

 2014 European Parliament election in Germany
 Counts, dukes and grand dukes of Oldenburg
 List of people who have been pied

References

External links

  
 
 

1971 births
Living people
Politicians from Lübeck
Duchesses of Oldenburg
Free Democratic Party (Germany) politicians
Members of the Bundestag for Berlin
Members of the Bundestag 2021–2025
Members of the Bundestag 2017–2021
Alternative for Germany MEPs
MEPs for Germany 2014–2019
21st-century women MEPs for Germany
Jurists from Schleswig-Holstein
Female members of the Bundestag
Members of the Bundestag for the Alternative for Germany
Women opposition leaders